Mark McGeown (born 10 May 1970 in Paisley, Scotland) is a Scottish former footballer, who last played for Queen's Park in the Scottish Football League Third Division. He was a goalkeeper.

McGeown began his senior career with Stirling Albion where he spent over a decade and made 338 league appearances. He has also played for Raith Rovers (on loan), Stranraer, Airdrie United, Ayr United, Dumbarton, Queen of the South and Queens Park .

McGeown signed for Queen of the South on amateur forms in September 2009, as cover for David Hutton whilst Ludovic Roy recovered from a hip injury. McGeown left the Dumfries club in the January 2010 transfer window without having played a first team. McGeown signed for Queens Park in January 2010 and finished his career at the end of that season.

Whilst playing for Stranraer he was officially credited with scoring one goal in a league match.

Honours
Dumbarton
Scottish Division Three (fourth tier): Winners 2008–09
Airdrie United
Scottish Division Two (3rd tier): Winners 2003–04 
Stirling Albion
Scottish Division Two (3rd tier): Winners 1995–96 
Stirling Albion
Scottish Division Two (3rd tier): Winners 1990–91

See also
 List of footballers in Scotland by number of league appearances (500+)

References

External links 
 

1970 births
Living people
Association football goalkeepers
Scottish footballers
Stirling Albion F.C. players
Queen's Park F.C. players
Scottish Junior Football Association players
Stranraer F.C. players
Raith Rovers F.C. players
Airdrieonians F.C. players
Ayr United F.C. players
Dumbarton F.C. players
Queen of the South F.C. players
Scottish Football League players
Blantyre Victoria F.C. players
Footballers from Paisley, Renfrewshire